The 2015–16 Ukrainian Premier League Reserves and Under 19 season are competitions between the reserves of Ukrainian Premier League Clubs and the Under 19s. The events in the senior leagues during the 2014–15 season saw Illichivets Mariupol Reserves relegated with Metalurh Donetsk Reserves expelled with Oleksandriya Reserves and Stal Dniprodzerzhynsk Reserves entering the competition.

Managers

Final standings

Top scorers

See also
2015–16 Ukrainian Premier League

References

 

Reserves
Ukrainian Premier Reserve League seasons